Vietnam! Vietnam! is a United States Information Agency (USIA) film about the Vietnam War. The film, narrated by Charlton Heston, was shot on location in Vietnam in October–December 1968 but not released until 1971. Though John Ford, the executive producer, went to Vietnam, he did not participate in production work there. Ford later did supervise the editing and rewrote the film scenario.

Bruce Herschensohn, the producer, remarked that the purpose of the film was to provide a "balance" to the view which critics of the war were providing. Due to the changing political situation in Vietnam, the film went through numerous cuts and script alterations over a three-year period and, when finally released, managed to offend almost everyone. Critical reviews were unfavorable. USIA Director Frank Shakespeare left the decision on whether to order a copy of the film up to individual US Embassies abroad, and only a few did.

See also
 List of American films of 1971

References

External links

 

1971 films
Documentary films about the Vietnam War
United States Information Agency films
American propaganda films
1970s English-language films
1970s American films